Karolina Bochra (born 31 August 1988) is a Polish footballer who plays as a striker for 1.FC Katowice in the Ekstraliga. She previously played for Gol Częstochowa and AZS Wroclaw.

She was a member of the Polish national team in the 2008 Algarve Cup, where she scored against host Portugal.

Titles
 2 Polish Leagues (2007, 2008) 
 1 Polish Cup (2007)

References

External links

1988 births
Living people
Place of birth missing (living people)
Polish women's footballers
Women's association football forwards
Arminia Bielefeld players
2. Frauen-Bundesliga players
Poland women's international footballers
Polish expatriate footballers
Polish expatriate sportspeople in Germany
Expatriate women's footballers in Germany